Hard Promises is the fourth studio album by Tom Petty and the Heartbreakers released on May 5, 1981 on Backstreet Records.

History
Its original working title was Benmont's Revenge, referring to the band's keyboard player, Benmont Tench. The album features guest vocals from Stevie Nicks of Fleetwood Mac on the duet "Insider". The Heartbreakers also recorded the hit "Stop Draggin' My Heart Around" for Nicks' album Bella Donna around the time Hard Promises was recorded.

This was the second Tom Petty album on the Backstreet Records label. The album's release was delayed while Petty and his distributor MCA Records argued about the list price. The album was slated to be the next MCA release with the new list price of $9.98, following Steely Dan's Gaucho and the Olivia Newton-John/Electric Light Orchestra Xanadu soundtrack. This so-called "superstar pricing" was $1.00 more than the usual list price of $8.98. Petty voiced his objections to the price hike in the press and the issue became a popular cause among music fans. Non-delivery of the album or naming it Eight Ninety-Eight were considered, but eventually MCA decided against the price increase.

The album's title comes from a line in the chorus of "Insider".

Hard Promises was the last full album to feature bassist Ron Blair until Mojo, although he would make guest appearances on Long After Dark and Southern Accents and, after rejoining the band in 2002, played on select tracks on The Last DJ. He was replaced by Howie Epstein, who continued to play until his removal in 2002 due to deteriorating health.

In 2000 it was voted number 968 in Colin Larkin's All Time Top 1000 Albums.

John Lennon tribute

During the recording of the album, John Lennon was scheduled to be in the same studio at the same time. Petty was looking forward to meeting him when he came in. The meeting never occurred, as Lennon was murdered before the date of his planned visit to the studio. Petty and the band paid tribute to the slain former Beatle by etching "WE LOVE YOU J.L." in the runout deadwax on early U.S. and Canadian pressings of Hard Promises.

Track listing

Personnel
Tom Petty & the Heartbreakers
Tom Petty – lead and backing vocals, guitar (acoustic, electric, 12-string, bass on "Something Big"), electric piano on "Something Big"
Mike Campbell – guitars (acoustic, electric, 12-string, bass), auto-harp, accordion, harmonium
Benmont Tench – organ, piano, backing vocals
Ron Blair – bass guitar
Stan Lynch – drums, backing vocals

Additional musicians
Stevie Nicks – backing vocals on "Insider" and "You Can Still Change Your Mind"
Lori Nicks - backing vocals on "Insider"
Sharon Celani – backing vocals on "You Can Still Change Your Mind"
Donald "Duck" Dunn – bass guitar on "A Woman in Love"
Phil Jones – percussion
Alan "Bugs" Weidel – piano on "Nightwatchman"

Production

 Brad Gilderman – assistant engineer
Jimmy Iovine – producer
 Tom Petty – producer
Tori Swenson – assistant engineer
 Shelly Yakus – engineer

Charts

Weekly charts

Year-end charts

Certifications

References

Tom Petty albums
1981 albums
Albums produced by Jimmy Iovine
Albums produced by Tom Petty
Backstreet Records albums
Albums recorded at Sound City Studios